Aguna claxon, the emerald aguna, is a species of dicot skipper in the butterfly family Hesperiidae. It is found in Central America, North America, and South America.

References

Further reading

External links

 

Eudaminae
Articles created by Qbugbot